The McLaren M630 engine is a 3.0-litre, 120-degree, twin-turbocharged V6 engine, designed and developed for use in the Artura sportscar by McLaren Automotive.

Electric motor 
The combined torque peak is less than the sum of both sides as the output is limited to "optimize powertrain drivability characteristics." The 7.4-kWh lithium-ion battery pack weighs  and is positioned under the rear of the passenger compartment. McLaren claims a 2.5-hour charge time for an 80 percent charge using an EVSE cable and a 19-mile electric range under European testing methodology. This motor replaces the reverse gear, similar to the Ferrari SF90 Stradale.

Engine
The all-aluminum engine has a bank angle of 120 degrees, a world first for a production V6 engine. This is to accommodate a hot-vee layout, where the two turbochargers are placed in the vee of the engine. Power is sent to the rear wheels through an all-new 8 speed dual-clutch transmission. The redline is set at 8,500 rpm.

Applications
McLaren Artura

References

External links
Official McLaren Automotive website

Gasoline engines by model
McLaren Group
V6 engines